City of Silence is a three-issue comic book limited series written by Warren Ellis and drawn by Gary Erskine.

Publication history
The original title was going to be Silencers, to be published by Epic Comics in the mid 1990s, but Epic folded and it was not published until 2000 when it finally saw print as City of Silence, published by Image Comics.

Collected editions
The series has been collected into a trade paperback:
 City of Silence (104 pages, July 2004, Image Comics)

References

External links
City of Silence #1-3 review, Pop Image